Luca Ceccarelli (born 20 March 1983) is an Italian footballer who plays as a defender. He plays for amateur side Nibbiano.

Football career

Fiorentina
Luca Ceccarelli started his career at Fiorentina. He made his Serie A debut against Internazionale, on 25 November 2001, at the age of 18. That season he played 12 Serie A matches. He rejected a contract extension in April 2002. and then on 30 June 2002, Ceccarelli was signed by A.C. Milan. His team-mate Emiliano Moretti joined Juventus on the same day, but the funds raised from these transfers were insufficient to prevent AC Fiorentina's bankruptcy that year.

In July 2002, he was signed by Inter Milan in a €2.58 million co-ownership deal with A.C. Milan (around 5 billion lire).

Internazionale
Ceccarelli proved unable to break into the first team in Internazionale and spent his time there on loan. He was loaned to Venezia of Serie B in August 2002, and in January 2003 to Fermana (Serie C1). In the following seasons, he was loaned to Spezia and Pro Patria (Serie C1). In the 2005–06 season, he joined Catanzaro (Serie B). In 2006–07, he was returned to Serie C1 to play for Lucchese. In summer 2007, he rejoined Spezia, this time in Serie B.

Verona
In June 2008, Milan bought back Ceccarelli from Internazionale for a nominal fee, Inter made a profit of (€2.49 million) as the club no longer needed to pay for the residual half of the registration rights which already amortized. At the same time Milan write down €2.58 million for the residual value of the player's contract, as the revenue (and profit if any) of sold in was already treated as full registration rights in 2002 and the retained half was treated as a special asset called "co-ownership asset" with a value of €2.58 million.

He was then sold to Serie C1 team Hellas Verona on 1 September.

Spezia
Ceccarelli returned to Spezia again on 3 July 2013 on a two-year contract. On 31 January 2014 he left for Siena to boost the chance of promotion back to Serie A. On 20 January 2015 he was signed by Catania.

Virtus Entella
On 28 August 2015 Ceccarelli was signed by Virtus Entella.

Pistoiese
On 11 October 2018, he joined Pistoiese on a one-year deal with an automatic extension option.

Arezzo
On 27 September 2019, he signed a 1-year contract with Arezzo.

Pergolettese
On 1 September 2020, he joined Pergolettese.

References

External links
http://www.gazzetta.it/speciali/serie_b/2008_nw/giocatori/59912.shtml
 Profile at Football.it 
 Profile at FIGC 

Italian footballers
Italy youth international footballers
ACF Fiorentina players
Inter Milan players
A.C. Milan players
Venezia F.C. players
Spezia Calcio players
U.S. Catanzaro 1929 players
S.S.D. Lucchese 1905 players
A.C.N. Siena 1904 players
Catania S.S.D. players
Virtus Entella players
U.S. Pistoiese 1921 players
S.S. Arezzo players
U.S. Pergolettese 1932 players
People from Massa
Sportspeople from the Province of Massa-Carrara
Serie A players
Serie B players
Serie C players
Association football defenders
1983 births
Living people
Footballers from Tuscany